The 1967 World Archery Championships was the 24th edition of the event. It was held in Amersfoort, Netherlands on 25–28 July 1967 and was organised by World Archery Federation (FITA).

Medals summary

Recurve

Medals table

References

External links
 World Archery website
 Complete results
 British Pathe newsreel footage

World Championship
World Archery
A
World Archery Championships